Maimansingha Gitika, is a collection of folk ballads from the region of Mymensingh, Bangladesh.  They were published in English as Eastern Bengal Ballads. Dinesh Chandra Sen collected the songs, and Dinesh Chandra Sen was the editor; the collection was published by the University of Calcutta, along with another similar publication named Purbabanga-gitika. Researcher Asaddor Ali discovered that nine famous so-called Maimansingha Gitika were actually Sylheti in origin.

See also
 Sylhet Gitika
 Bangladeshi folk literature
 Bengali literature

References

 

Bengali-language literature
 Folk music publications
Sylheti language